Hima Das (born 9 January 2000), nicknamed Dhing Express, is an Indian sprinter from the state of Assam. She holds the current Indian national record in 400 meters with a timing of 50.79 s that she clocked at the 2018 Asian Games in Jakarta, Indonesia. She is the first Indian athlete to win a gold medal in a track event at the IAAF World U20 Championships. She was appointed as a Deputy Superintendent of Police (DSP) in Assam Police under the state's Integrated Sport Policy.

Early life 
Hima Das was born at Kandhulimari village, near the town of Dhing in her home state of Assam to Ronjit Das and Jonali Das in a Assamese Kaibartta family. Her parents are farmers by profession. She is the youngest of five siblings. She completed early education from Dhing Public High School. She used to play football and had always wanted to pursue a career in football. However, she did not see any prospects for herself in the women's football in India. 

At one of the inter-school camps held at the nearby Jawahar Navodaya Vidyalaya (JNV), she would arrive at the ground before practise began, and sometimes even before the gates were opened. A physical education teacher at the Vidyalaya, Samsul Hoque, was impressed by her determination and punctuality. He was more impressed to see her win every race the Vidyalaya organised in the following days. Hoque later convinced her to pursue a career in sprinting.

Das passed her 12th board exams in May 2019. She is currently pursuing her B.A degree in Cotton University, Assam.

Career 
In April 2018, Das competed in the 2018 Commonwealth Games at Gold Coast, Australia, in the 400 metres and the 4×400 metres relay.

On 12 July 2018, Das won the 400 m final at the World U-20 Championships 2018 held at Tampere, Finland, clocking  51.46 seconds and becoming the first Indian sprinter to win a gold medal at an international track event.

At the 2018 Asian Games, Das qualified for the 400 m final, after clocking 51.00 in heat 1 and setting a new Indian national record. On 26 August 2018 she improved the national record to 50.79 s in the 400 m final however she could win only the silver medal. Later on 30 August 2018, she, along with M. R. Poovamma, Sarita Gayakwad and V. K. Vismaya won the women's 4 × 400 metres relay clocking 3:28.72. Hima also won a silver medal in the 4 × 400 m mixed relay, which was held for the first time at Asian Games.

Das continued her success in 2019 winning the 200m gold in Poznan  Grand Prix in Poland, on 2 July 2019, with a time of 23.65 seconds.

On 13 July, she won the 200m at the Kladno  Meet in the Czech Republic with a time of 23.43 seconds.

On 20 July 2019, she achieved her third win in a month, and fifth win, in the 400-meters in Nové Město, Czech Republic in a time of 52.09 seconds.

She was named for the World Championships to be held at Doha in October 2019. However a month before, she was ruled out of participation due to a back problem, that had started right after she competed at the Asian games the previous year.

On 27 February 2021, Das enrolled as a civil servant in the post of  Deputy Superintendent of Police of Assam Police Service cadre through Assam Public Service Commission Direct Entry.

Awards and accolades 

Conferred with Arjuna Award by the President of India  on 25 September 2018.
 Das appeared in India's famous TV reality-show conducted by actor Amitabh Bachchan called Kaun Banega Crorepati on 1 November 2019.
 Hima Das Appointed as a civil servant under the post of Deputy Superintendent of Police in Assam Police Service cadre by Assam Public Service Commission without her appearing for the Combined Competitive Examination but through direct entry mode in February 2021
 Das is the second athlete from Assam after Bhogeswar Baruah to win a gold medal at an international event.

References

External links

2000 births
Living people
Indian female sprinters
Commonwealth Games competitors for India
Athletes (track and field) at the 2018 Commonwealth Games
Athletes (track and field) at the 2022 Commonwealth Games
Athletes (track and field) at the 2018 Asian Games
Asian Games gold medalists for India
People from Nagaon district
Asian Games silver medalists for India
Recipients of the Arjuna Award
Asian Games medalists in athletics (track and field)
Medalists at the 2018 Asian Games
World Athletics U20 Championships winners
Athletes from Assam
Sportswomen from Assam